1010 Brickell is a residential high-rise in the Brickell neighborhood of Miami, Florida. It is located behind an office building at 1000 Brickell Avenue, adjacent to the Tenth Street Metromover station. Construction began in 2014 and required the demolition of an existing parking garage. The  mat pour was completed on April 4, 2015.

See also
 List of tallest buildings in Miami

References

Residential skyscrapers in Miami
Residential condominiums in Miami
Residential buildings completed in 2017
2017 establishments in Florida